Shin Hae-sook (born 29 November 1957) is a South Korean former figure skater. She competed in the ladies' singles event at the 1980 Winter Olympics.

References

1957 births
Living people
South Korean female single skaters
Olympic figure skaters of South Korea
Figure skaters at the 1980 Winter Olympics
Place of birth missing (living people)